The Town of Blanca is a Statutory Town located in Costilla County, Colorado, United States. The town population was 322 at the 2020 census. Blanca is located in the enormous San Luis Valley.

History
The town, named for Blanca Peak, was founded in August 1908 from a land lottery in the San Luis Valley of south central Colorado. It was incorporated in 1909.

In the mid-1990s Polish settlers set up shop at the Red Rocks General Store selling liquor, beer, polish sausages, and other eastern European goods. Blanca is the region's main supplier of bilberry syrup. Blanca is known for elk hunting and alpine trout fishing.

Geography
Blanca is at  (37.440569, -105.509901) in the east of the San Luis Valley and northern Costilla County.

The region has a cool, dry climate, with 107 frost-free days each year.

In areas not irrigated, dunes carry sparse vegetation such as  greasewood, rubber rabbitbrush, salt grass, sandhill muhly and sand dropseed. The dunes are intermingled with depressions and basins of historical playas. The Blanca Wetlands, an Area of Critical Environmental Concern, lies northwest of the town. The wetlands receive groundwater for irrigation from the Closed Basin Project, which delivers groundwater to the Rio Grande.

Demographics

As of the census of 2000, there were 391 people, 142 households, and 105 families in the town. The racial makeup was 53.45% White, 0.77% African American, 1.28% Native American, 2.81% Asian, 39.64% from other races, and 2.05% from two or more races. Hispanic or Latino of any race were 67.01%.

There were 142 households, of which 35.2% had children under 1, 63.4% were married couples living together, 7.7% a female householder with no husband present, and 25.4% were non-families. 21.1% of households were of individuals and 9.9% had someone living alone who was 65 or older.  The average household size was 2.75 and the average family size 3.26.

In the town, the population was 27.9% under 18, 8.2% from 18 to 24, 27.9% from 25 to 44, 21.7% from 45 to 64, and 14.3% 65 or older.  The median age was 37. For every 100 females, there were 106.9 males.  For every 100 females 18 and over, there were 102.9 males.

The median income for a household in the town was $22,875, and the median income for a family $22,411. Males had a median income of $20,125 versus $15,833 for females. The per capita income for the town was $10,200.  About 19.5% of families and 21.6% of the population were below the poverty line, including 29.1% of those under 18 and 11.3% of those 65 or over.

See also

Colorado
Bibliography of Colorado
Index of Colorado-related articles
Outline of Colorado
List of counties in Colorado
List of municipalities in Colorado
List of places in Colorado
Blanca Peak
San Luis Valley

References

External links

Town of Blanca website
CDOT map of the Town of Blanca

Towns in Costilla County, Colorado
Towns in Colorado